The Office for Product Safety and Standards is part of the Department for Business, Energy and Industrial Strategy of the Government of the United Kingdom, responsible for the safety of consumer products, and the regulation of measurement standards.

Role
The OPSS was created in January 2018 from the Regulatory Delivery directorate of the Department for Business, Energy and Industrial Strategy.

OPSS is the regulator for all consumer products in the United Kingdom, except for vehicles (regulated by the Driver and Vehicle Standards Agency), medicines (the Medicines and Healthcare products Regulatory Agency) and food (the Food Standards Agency). It is also the national regulator for legal metrology, ensuring weighing and measuring instruments are accurate and reliable.

See also
 Standards Department
 National Measurement and Regulation Office
 U.S. Consumer Product Safety Commission

References

External links

Department for Business, Energy and Industrial Strategy
Public bodies and task forces of the United Kingdom government
Consumer rights agencies
Standards organisations in the United Kingdom